Robert Gambier Bolton (24 August 1854 – 29 July 1928) was an English author and photographer of subjects on natural history and psychical phenomena.
Bolton made numerous photographs of animals during his travels to many countries, including one with the party accompanying the Duke of Newcastle on his tour. His interest in animal photography was professional, amongst the first intending to profit from this pursuit. His works are sometimes preserved as scientific records for societies, though their value was not widely recognised, and appeared in journals and books of zoology.

He was a founding member of the club devoted to Siamese cats, founded in England in 1901.

References

1854 births
1928 deaths
Nature photographers
Parapsychologists